Jennifer Blanc (born Jennifer Tara) is an American actress. She was born in New York City. She is married to actor Michael Biehn.

Personal life

Blanc, who goes by Jennifer Blanc-Biehn, is married to Michael Biehn. The couple have one son, Dashiell King Biehn, born March 21, 2015. The two were joint partners in "The Blanc/Biehn Production Company". She co-produced and starred alongside him in The Victim. She also co-starred in Good Family Times, a supernatural thriller film, which was also produced by Blanc/Biehn Productions.

Selected filmography

Film

Television

References

External links

Living people
Year of birth missing (living people)
American film actresses
American stage actresses
American television actresses
American voice actresses
American child actresses
Actresses from New York City
20th-century American actresses
21st-century American actresses